This table displays the top-rated primetime television series of the 1951–52 season as measured by Nielsen Media Research.

References

1951 in American television
1952 in American television
1951-related lists
1952-related lists
Lists of American television series